The 2009 Winston-Salem mayoral election was held on November 3, 2009 to elect the mayor of Winston-Salem, North Carolina. It saw the reelection of Allen Joines.

General election

References 

Winston-Salem
Mayoral elections in Winston-Salem, North Carolina
Winston-Salem